Davies Dome is a small ice dome with rock walls at the margins, rising to  southeast of Stoneley Point on James Ross Island. It was named by the UK Antarctic Place-Names Committee in 1987 after Gwion ("Taff") Davies, general assistant on Operation Tabarin at Port Lockroy, 1943–44, and Hope Bay, 1944–45.

References
 

Ice caps of Antarctica
Bodies of ice of Graham Land
Landforms of James Ross Island